Ministère des affaires étrangères is French for "Ministry of Foreign Affairs".

It may also refer to:

 Ministry of Europe and Foreign Affairs, the French foreign ministry
 Ministry of Foreign Affairs (Algeria)
 Ministry of Foreign Affairs (Luxembourg)
 Ministry of Foreign Affairs (Ottoman Empire), where French was the occasionally the working language
 Ministry of Foreign Affairs (Tunisia)
 Ministry of Foreign Affairs and International Cooperation (Cambodia)
 Ministry of Foreign Affairs and International Cooperation (Morocco)

See also
 Ministry
 Foreign affairs